The ASEAN Football Federation Championship (less formally known as the AFF Championship or AFF Cup), currently known as the AFF Mitsubishi Electric Cup for sponsorship reasons, is the primary association football tournament organized by the ASEAN Football Federation (AFF) for men's national teams in Southeast Asia. 

A biennial international association football competition, it is contested by the men's national teams of the AFF to determine the sub-continental champion of Southeast Asia. The competition has been held every two years since 1996 scheduled to be in the even-numbered year, except for 2007, and 2020 (which was postponed to 2021 due to the COVID-19 pandemic).

The AFF Championship title have been won by four national teams; Thailand have won seven titles, Singapore has four titles, Vietnam has two titles and Malaysia with one title. To date, Thailand and Singapore are the only teams in history to have won consecutive titles; Thailand in 2000 and 2002, 2014 and 2016 and also 2020 and 2022, and Singapore in 2004 and 2007. It is one of the most watched football tournaments in the region. The AFF Championship is also recognized as an 'A' international tournament by FIFA with FIFA ranking points being awarded since 1996.

Since 2018, the championship winners would compete in the following AFF–EAFF Champions Trophy, against the winner of the EAFF E-1 Football Championship, the champions of East Asia, to determine the champions of East and Southeast Asia. Although having joined the AFF on 27 August 2013, Australia has not been allowed by the AFF to attend the AFF Championship.

History
The first ASEAN Championship took place in 1996 with the six founding members of ASEAN Federation competing with four nations being invited that came in that region. The final saw Thailand become the first champions of ASEAN as they defeated Malaysia 1–0 in Singapore. The top four nations automatically qualified through to the finals in the following edition. This meant the other six nations had to compete in qualifying for the remaining four spots. Myanmar, Singapore, Laos and Philippines all made it through to the main tournament.

Organisation
Sports marketing, media and event management firm, Lagardère Sports has been involved in the tournament since the inaugural edition in 1996.

Sponsorship 
Founded as the Tiger Cup after Singapore-based Asia Pacific Breweries brand Tiger Beer, it sponsored the competition from the competition's inauguration in 1996 until the 2004 edition. After Asia Pacific Breweries withdrew as title sponsor, the competition was known simply as the AFF Championship for the 2007 edition. In 2008, Japanese auto-company Suzuki bought the naming rights for the competition, and the competition was named the AFF Suzuki Cup until the 2020 edition. On 23 May 2022, AFF announced a new title sponsorship deal with Japanese company Mitsubishi Electric and the competition was named the AFF Mitsubishi Electric Cup starting in the 2022 edition.

Format
From 2004, the knockout stage is played over two legs on a home-and-away format. Since the 2007 edition, there was no third place match; semi-finalists are listed in alphabetical order. The away goals rule has been applied for knockout stage since the 2010 edition.

Starting with the 2018 edition, a new format was applied. The nine highest ranked teams qualified automatically while the 10th and 11th ranked teams playing in a two-legged qualifier. The 10 teams were split in two groups of five and play a round robin system, with each team playing two home and two away fixtures. A draw was made to determine where the teams play while the format of the knockout round remained unchanged.

Results

Performances by country

Participating nations

Legend

  – Champions
  – Runners-up
  – Third place
  – Fourth place
  – Semi-finalist

 GS – Group stage
 Q – Qualified for the current tournament
  — Qualified but withdrew
  – Did not qualify
  – Did not enter / Withdrew / Banned
  – Hosts

Notes

Awards

Winning coaches 

Notes
 - being the only person to win the competition as a player (1996, 2000, 2002) then coach (2014, 2016).

All-time ranking table

Records and statistics

Overall top goalscorers

{|class="wikitable"
|-
! Rank
! Player
! Goals
|-
| align=center|1 || Teerasil Dangda||align=center|25 
|-
| align=center|2 || Noh Alam Shah ||align=center|17
|-
|rowspan=2 align=center|3 ||  Worrawoot Srimaka ||rowspan=2 align=center|15
|-
| Lê Công Vinh
|-
|align=center|5 || Lê Huỳnh Đức ||align=center|14
|-
|rowspan=2 align=center|6 || Adisak Kraisorn ||rowspan=2 align=center|13
|-
| Kurniawan Dwi Yulianto 
|-
|rowspan=2 align=center|8 || Bambang Pamungkas ||rowspan=2 align=center|12
|-
| Kiatisuk Senamuang
|-
|align=center|10 || Agu Casmir ||align=center|11
|-
|align=center|11 || Khairul Amri || align=center|10
|}

 Bold''' denotes players still playing international football

Hat-tricks

See also
 Football at the Southeast Asian Games
 AFF Women's Championship
 AFC Asian Cup
 CAFA Championship
 EAFF E-1 Football Championship
 SAFF Championship
 WAFF Championship

Notes

References

External links
 
 AFF Cup at RSSSF.com

 
AFF competitions
Recurring sporting events established in 1996
1996 establishments in Southeast Asia
Biennial sporting events